The following is a list of Government, Aided, Government Cost Sharing, and Private self-financing Engineering Colleges in the southwestern Indian state of Kerala. 

All the engineering colleges in the state excluding Central Government engineering institutions and colleges under direct control of other universities are affiliated to the A P J Abdul Kalam Technological University (APJAKTU). There are 30 
government controlled engineering colleges in the state (Including Govt, aided and government cost sharing ones).

Central Government Engineering Colleges

State Government Engineering Colleges

Engineering Colleges Under Government Departments

Engineering Colleges Under Universities

Engineering Colleges Under Kerala Veterinary and Animal Sciences University

Private Self-Financing Colleges 

Engineering colleges were affiliated to various universities till 2014-15. From 2015-16 all engineering colleges in Kerala state are affiliated to KTU.

See also
 KEAM

References

External links 
 Engineering Colleges in Kerala 2014-15 by Engineers World Magazine
 ACE COLLEGE OF ENGINEERING
 District-wise Listing of Engineering Colleges in Kerala

 
Engineering colleges
Kerala